The Last Waltz King or Carl Michael Ziehrer, the Last Waltz King (German:Carl Michael Ziehrer, der letzte Walzerkönig) is a 1922 Austrian silent film directed by Wilhelm Thiele and starring Fritz Schroeter, Gabriele Modl and Richard Waldemar. It is based on the life of the nineteenth century composer Karl Michael Ziehrer. A sequel, Tales of Old Vienna, was released the following year.

Cast
 Fritz Schroeter 
 Gabriele Modl 
 Richard Waldemar 
 Franz Glawatsch 
 Emil De Varney 
 Karl Schöpler 
 Wilhelm Thiele

See also
Viennese Girls (1945/49), another film about Karl Michael Ziehrer

References

Bibliography
 Murphy, Robert. Directors in British and Irish Cinema: A Reference Companion. British Film Institute, 2006.

External links

1922 films
1920s biographical films
Austrian biographical films
Austrian silent feature films
Films directed by Wilhelm Thiele
Films set in the 19th century
Films set in Vienna
Films about classical music and musicians
Films about composers
Films with screenplays by Wilhelm Thiele
Austrian black-and-white films